= Difficult Men =

Nonfiction book by Brett Martin

- Author: Brett Martin
- Language: English
- Subject: Television
- Genre: Nonfiction
- Publisher: Penguin Press
- Publication date: June 27, 2013
- Publication place: United States
- ISBN: 978-1594204197

Difficult Men: Behind the Scenes of a Creative Revolution: from The Sopranos and The Wire to Mad Men and Breaking Bad is a nonfiction book written by Brett Martin.

== Overview ==
Insights into the showrunners of modern day television and the characters they create.

== Critical reception ==
The Guardian wrote "Most of all, the book leaves the image of the showrunner: the possibly unstable writer, in charge of every detail of a massive artistic-commercial enterprise."

The Boston Globe said "But the point of “Difficult Men” is not merely to post images of our writer-producer heroes’ clay feet onto Instagram. It is, instead, to demonstrate the sheer ferocity required for producing great television."

The Toronto Star said "Brett Martin’s Difficult Men tells the inside, behind-the-scenes story of this “Third Golden Age” of television, one that has seen the “open-ended, 12- or 13-episode [per season] serialized drama” become “the signature American art form of the first decade of the 21st century.”"

The Christian Science Monitor wrote "What the book lacks in juicy Hollywood gossip it makes up in smart analysis and a comprehensive big-picture view of what makes shows precious in the best meaning of the word. In other words, not Northern Exposure-style "precious.""
